Stierjoch is a mountain at the border of Bavaria, Germany with Tyrol, Austria. The climb is easy, but long.

Mountains of Bavaria
Mountains of the Alps